Diphyllobothrium elegans is a species of tapeworms. It has been found in the hooded seal (Cystophora cristata).

References

External links 
 Diphyllobothrium elegans at WoRMS

Cestoda
Parasitic animals of mammals